Hart Hill is an inner area of Luton north-east of the town centre, centred on Hart Lane, in the Borough of Luton, in the ceremonial county of Bedfordshire, England. It is roughly bounded by Turners Road South and Vauxhall Way to the north, Crescent Road to the South, Crawley Green Road to the East, and Hitchin Road to the West.

Local area
The area is mainly residential, with a few scattered shops along Hart Lane and Abbots Wood Road. The area is served by St. Anne's Church on Crawley Green Road, which also gives its name to the area around it, St. Anne's Hill, an undefined area that overlaps parts of Hart Hill and Crawley Green.

The south of Hart Hill became established in the 19th century, including Hart Hill Drive, a private road of houses overlooking the town. However, most of the northern part of Hart Hill consists of post war estate housing.

There is a Grade II-listed water tower on Hart Lane which is one of the most prominent points on Luton's skyline if looking eastwards from the centre. The building was erected in 1901 following a drought that affected the Stopsley area and is a counterpart to a similarly aged water tower on West Hill Road in New Town.

Also in the area are Hart Hill Nursery School and Hart Hill adventure play area.

Politics 
Hart Hill is split between the Round Green, Crawley and High Town wards. The wards form part of the parliamentary constituency of Luton South and the MP is Rachel Hopkins (Labour).

References 

Areas of Luton